Lady Mary of Looz-Heinsberg (1424 – 20 April 1502), was a noble lady from the House of Looz and through marriage Countess of Nassau-Siegen.

Biography
Mary was born in 1424 as the eldest daughter of Lord John II of Looz-Heinsberg and his second wife Countess Anne of Solms. Her older halfbrother John was Prince-bishop of Liège.

Mary married on 7 February 1440 to Count John IV of Nassau-Siegen (Breda Castle, 1 August 1410 – Dillenburg, 3 February 1475), the eldest son of Count Engelbert I of Nassau-Siegen and Lady Joanne of Polanen. In the period between the marriage and the death of John’s father in 1442, Mary and John lived in the house De Herberghe in the Reigerstraat in Breda. After that they had their main Residenz in Breda Castle, from where John managed his domains located in the Netherlands. John also succeeded his father as Count of Nassau-Siegen together with his brother Henry II. On 22 February 1447 John and his brother Henry divided their possessions, whereby John received the possessions in the Netherlands, ¼ of the County of Vianden, as well as Herborn.

Mary was known as a very devout Catholic.

After the death of his brother in 1451, John inherited his brother’s possessions. His widespread possessions forced John to travel constantly, in order to govern his possessions well. When John was in his county, he governed it from Siegen or Dillenburg. When the count’s family started staying in the county more often, a court was established. John had Dillenburg Castle – which until then had been used primarily as a stronghold against the unruly local nobility – extended in the period 1453–1467 and rebuilt into a residential castle for the count’s family. In 1464 Mary had a church chair made in the castle chapel and a shrine for the Blessed Sacrament.

In 1469 Mary sent for rosemary and other herbs to be brought to Dillenburg from the Rhine (Cologne or Koblenz), presumably because of the plague. This is the oldest surviving report in the accounts about medicines.

This led to a dispute with John’s distant relative Count John II of Nassau-Saarbrücken, who was married to Lady Jeanne of Looz-Heinsberg, the daughter and heiress of Lord John IV of Looz-Heinsberg. At Mary’s husband’s request, Emperor Frederick III declared on 28 May 1470 that by granting the entire Duchy of Jülich to Duke Gerhard VII, the claims of Mary and her sister Philippa of Looz-Heinsberg, were not to be affected. Apparently this had no effect, because in 1471 or 1472 the Emperor ordered Duke Charles ‘the Bold’ of Burgundy to settle on his behalf the dispute between Gerhard on the one hand and Mary and John on the other. In 1474, the Emperor withdrew the order to Charles ‘the Bold’ and instead transferred the matter to Archbishop John II of Trier. The dispute became more complicated when in 1472 Gerhard VII’s son William married to Countess Elisabeth of Nassau-Saarbrücken, John II’s eldest daughter, who had inherited her mother’s possessions. The dispute was only settled when on 25 August 1499 Mary’s eldest son Engelbert II transferred his half of the castle and the land of Millen with the towns of Gangelt and Vught to Duke William of Jülich and Berg and received in exchange from the latter on 27 August 1499 the city and the land of Diest and the castle and the land of Zichem and Zeelhem.

She also devoted herself to the nunnery Saint Catherinadal Abbey in Breda. And in 1486 she generously endowed Saint Wendelin’s chapel in Breda.

Mary stipulated in her will and testament, drawn up in 1501, that the  should distribute 100  of grain from her estate for the poor of Dillenburg. She died in Siegen on 20 April 1502 and was buried in the Grote Kerk in Breda.

Issue
From the marriage of Mary and John the following children were born:
 Anne (1440 or 1441 – Celle, 5 or 8 April 1514), married:
 on 28 October 1467 to Duke Otto II of Brunswick-Lüneburg (1439 – January 1471);
 on 24 January 1474 to Count Philip ‘the Elder’ of Katzenelnbogen (1402 – 28 July 1479).
 Joanne (1444 – May 1468), married on 14 October 1464 to Count Philip I of Waldeck-Waldeck (1445 – 1475).
 Ottilie ( – Alkmaar, 22 April 1495). Was a nun in the Bethany Abbey near Mechelen until 1463 and then in the Saint Catherinadal Abbey in Breda 1463–1476. Was first prioress of Vredenburg Abbey in Bavel 1476–1495.
 Adriana (Breda, 7 February 1449 – 15 January 1477), married on 12 September 1468 to Count Philip I of Hanau-Münzenberg (21 September 1449 – 26 August 1500).
 Count Engelbert II ‘the Illustrious’ (Breda, 17 May 1451 – Brussels, 31 May 1504), succeeded his father in the possessions in the Netherlands. Married in Koblenz on 19 December 1468 to Margravine  (15 May 1450 – Breda, 5 July 1501).
 Count John V (Breda, 9 November 1455 – Dillenburg or Siegen, 30 July 1516), succeeded his father in Nassau-Siegen and Diez. Married in Marburg on 11 February 1482 to Landgravine Elisabeth of Hesse-Marburg (Marburg, May 1466 – Cologne, 17 January 1523).

Ancestors

Literature

Notes

References

Sources
 
 
 
 
 
 
 
 
 
 
 
 
 
  (1882). Het vorstenhuis Oranje-Nassau. Van de vroegste tijden tot heden (in Dutch). Leiden: A.W. Sijthoff/Utrecht: J.L. Beijers.

External links

 Limburg, Heinsberg, Valkenburg: B. Herren von Heinsberg (Sponheim). In: Medieval Lands. A prosopography of medieval European noble and royal families, by Charles Cawley.
 Loon-Heinsberg, Maria van (1424-1502) (in Dutch). In: Digitaal Vrouwenlexicon van Nederland.
 Maria van Loon (in Dutch). In: Erfgoedweb Breda (in Dutch).
 Nassau. In: Medieval Lands. A prosopography of medieval European noble and royal families, by Charles Cawley.
 Nassau Part 4. In: An Online Gotha, by Paul Theroff.

|-

Looz-Heinsberg, Mary
Looz-Heinsberg, Mary
Countesses of Nassau
House of Loon
∞
Looz-Heinsberg, Mary
Looz-Heinsberg, Mary
Looz-Heinsberg, Mary